Guatemala competed at the 1992 Summer Olympics in Barcelona, Spain. 14 competitors, 12 men and 2 women, took part in 27 events in 7 sports.

Competitors
The following is the list of number of competitors in the Games.

Boxing

Men's Bantamweight
 Magno Ruiz

Men's Lightweight
 Mauricio Avila

Gymnastics

Women's Horse Vault
Luisa Portocarrero

Women's Uneven Bars
Luisa Portocarrero

Women's Balance Beam
Luisa Portocarrero

Women's Individual All-Around
Luisa Portocarrero

Modern pentathlon

One male pentathletes represented Guatemala in 1992.

Men's Individual Competition:
 Sergio Werner Sánchez Gómez – 4860 points (→ 47th place)

Shooting

Men's Running Target, 10 metres
Julio Sandoval
Cristian Bermúdez

Mixed Skeet
Francisco Romero Arribas

Swimming

Men's 50 m Freestyle
 Andrés Sedano
Heat – 25.53 (→ did not advance, 60th place)

 Gustavo Bucaro
Heat – 25.84 (→ did not advance, 63rd place)

Men's 100 m Freestyle
 Gustavo Bucaro
Heat – 54.74 (→ did not advance, 58th place)

 Helder Torres
Heat – 55.38 (→ did not advance, 61st place)

Men's 200 m Freestyle
 Gustavo Bucaro	
 Helder Torres

Men's 400 m Freestyle
 Gustavo Bucaro	
 Helder Torres	

Men's 1,500 m Freestyle
 Helder Torres

Men's 4 × 100 m Freestyle Relay
Andrés Sedano, Roberto Bonilla, Helder Torres, and Gustavo Bucaro
Heat – 3:42.53 (→ did not advance, 17th place)

Men's 4 × 200 m Freestyle Relay
Andrés Sedano, Helder Torres, Roberto Bonilla, and Gustavo Bucaro	

Men's 100 m Breaststroke
Roberto Bonilla

Men's 200 m Breaststroke
Roberto Bonilla

Men's 100 m Butterfly
 Gustavo Bucaro

Men's 200 m Individual Medley
Roberto Bonilla

Men's 400 m Individual Medley
Roberto Bonilla	

Women's 100 m Butterfly
Blanca Morales

Women's 200 m Butterfly
Blanca Morales

Men's 4 × 100 m Medley Relay
Roberto Bonilla, Helder Torres, Gustavo Bucaro, and Andrés Sedano

Weightlifting

Men's Middleweight
Luis Coronado

Wrestling

Men's Light-Flyweight Greco-Roman
Mynor Ramírez

See also
Guatemala at the 1991 Pan American Games

References

External links
Guatemala at the Olympic Games

Nations at the 1992 Summer Olympics
1992
Olympics